A performance indicator or key performance indicator (KPI) is a type of performance measurement. KPIs evaluate the success of an organization or of a particular activity (such as projects, programs, products and other initiatives) in which it engages. KPIs provide a focus for strategic and operational improvement, create an analytical basis for decision making and help focus attention on what matters most.

Often success is simply the repeated, periodic achievement of some levels of operational goal (e.g. zero defects, 10/10 customer satisfaction), and sometimes success is defined in terms of making progress toward strategic goals. Accordingly, choosing the right KPIs relies upon a good understanding of what is important to the organization. What is deemed important often depends on the department measuring the performance – e.g. the KPIs useful to finance will differ from the KPIs assigned to sales.

Since there is a need to understand well what is important, various techniques to assess the present state of the business, and its key activities, are associated with the selection of performance indicators. These assessments often lead to the identification of potential improvements, so performance indicators are routinely associated with 'performance improvement' initiatives. A very common way to choose KPIs is to apply a management framework such as the balanced scorecard.

The importance of such performance indicators is evident in the typical decision-making process (e.g. in management of organisations). When a decision-maker considers several options, they must be equipped to properly analyse the status quo to predict the consequences of future actions. Should they make their analysis on the basis of faulty or incomplete information, the predictions will not be reliable and consequently the decision made might yield an unexpected result. Therefore, the proper usage of performance indicators is vital to avoid such mistakes and minimise the risk.

Categorization of indicators
Key performance indicators define a set of values against which to measure. These raw sets of values, which can be fed to systems that aggregate the data, are called indicators. There are two categories of measurements for KPIs. 
 Quantitative facts presented with a specific objective numeric value measured against a standard. Usually they are not subject to distortion, personal feelings, prejudices, or interpretations. 
 Qualitative represents non-numeric conformance to a standard, or interpretation of personal feelings, tastes, opinions or experiences.

An 'indicator' can only measure what 'has' happened, in the past tense, so the only type of measurement is descriptive or lagging.  Any KPI that attempts to measure something in a future state as predictive, diagnostic or prescriptive is no longer an 'indicator', it is a 'prognosticator' – at this point, it is analytics (possibly based on a KPI) but leading KPIs are also used to indicate the amount of front end loading activities.

Points of measurement
Performance focuses on measuring a particular element of an activity. An activity can have four elements: input, output, control, and mechanism. At a minimum, activity is required to have at least an input and an output. Something goes into the activity as an input; the activity transforms the input by changing its state, and the activity produces an output. An activity can also enable mechanisms that are typically separated into human and system mechanisms. It can also be constrained in some way by a control. Lastly, its actions can have a temporal construct of time.

 Input indicates the inputs required of an activity to produce an output.
 Output captures the outcome or results of an activity or group of activities.
 Activity indicates the transformation produced by an activity (i.e., some form of work).
 Mechanism enables an activity to work (a performer), either human or system.
 Control is an object that controls the activity's production through compliance.
 Time indicates a temporal element of the activity.

Identifying indicators
Performance indicators differ from business drivers and aims (or goals). A school might consider the failure rate of its students as a key performance indicator which might help the school understand its position in the educational community, whereas a business might consider the percentage of income from returning customers as a potential KPI.

The key stages in identifying KPIs are:
 Having a pre-defined business process (BP).
 Having requirements for the BPs.
 Having a quantitative/qualitative measurement of the results and comparison with set goals.
 Investigating variances and tweaking processes or resources to achieve short-term goals.

Key performance indicators (KPIs) are ways to periodically assess the performances of organizations, business units, and their division, departments and employees. Accordingly, KPIs are most commonly defined in a way that is understandable, meaningful, and measurable. They are rarely defined in such a way that their fulfillment would be hampered by factors seen as non-controllable by the organizations or individuals responsible. Such KPIs are usually ignored by organizations.

KPIs should follow the SMART criteria. This means the measure has a Specific purpose for the business, it is Measurable to really get a value of the KPI, the defined norms have to be Achievable, the improvement of a KPI has to be Relevant to the success of the organization, and finally it must be Time phased, which means the value or outcomes are shown for a predefined and relevant period.

KPIs should be set at a senior level within an organization and cascaded through all levels of management. In order to be evaluated, KPIs are linked to target values, so that the value of the measure can be assessed as meeting expectations or not.

Key performance indicators are mostly the non-financial measures of a company's performance  – they do not have a monetary value but in a business context they do contribute to the company's profitability.

Examples

Accounts
These are some of the examples:

 Percentage of overdue invoices
 Percentage of purchase orders raised in advance
 Number of retrospectively raised purchase orders
 Finance report error rate (measures the quality of the report)
 Average cycle time of workflow
 Number of duplicate payments

Marketing and sales
 New customer acquisition
 Customer acquisition cost (CAC)
 Average deal size
 Demographic analysis of individuals (potential customers) applying to become customers, and the levels of approval, rejections, and pending numbers
 Status of existing customers
Customer density (the proportion of revenue attributable to a specified percentage of accounts, which ideally should match, for example the top 10% of accounts should broadly contribute 10% of revenue) 
 Customer attrition (the loss of clients or customers)
 Turnover (i.e., revenue) generated by segments of the customer population
 Outstanding balances held by segments of customers and terms of payment
 Collection of bad debts within customer relationships
 Profitability of customers by demographic segments and segmentation of customers by profitability

Many of these customer KPIs are developed and managed with customer relationship management software.

Faster availability of data is a competitive issue for most organizations. For example, businesses that have higher operational/credit risk (involving for example credit cards or wealth management) may want weekly or even daily availability of KPI analysis, facilitated by appropriate IT systems and tools.

Manufacturing
Overall equipment effectiveness (OEE) is a set of broadly accepted nonfinancial metrics that reflect manufacturing success.
 OEE = availability x performance x quality
 Availability = run time / total time; by definition this is the percentage of the actual amount of production time the machine is running to the production time the machine is available.
 Down time = time the building/ location/ service/ machine is out of operation due to any reason (including planned down time such as maintenance or 'out of season').
 Performance = total count / target counter, by definition this is the percentage of total parts produced on the machine to the production rate of machine.
 Quality = good count / total count, by definition, this is the percentage of good parts out of the total parts produced on the machine. 
 Cycle time ratio (CTR) = standard cycle time / real cycle time
Capacity utilization
 Rejection rate

Professional services
Most professional services firms (for example, management consultancies, systems integration firms, or digital marketing agencies) use three key performance indicators to track the health of their businesses. They typically use professional services automation (PSA) software to keep track of and manage these metrics.
 Utilization rate = the percentage of time employees spend generating revenue 
 Project profitability = the difference between the revenue generated by a project and the cost of delivering the work 
 Project success rate = the percentage of projects delivered on time and under budget

System operations
 Availability / uptime
 Mean time between failure
 Mean time to repair
 Unplanned availability
 Unplanned downtime
 Average time to repair

Project execution
 Earned value
 Cost variance
 Schedule variance
 Estimate to complete
 Manpower spent / month
 Money spent / month
 Planned spend / month
 Planned manpower / month
 Average time to delivery
 Tasks / staff
 Project overhead / ROI
 Planned delivery date vs actual delivery date

Supply chain management
Businesses can utilize supply chain KPIs to establish and monitor progress toward a variety of goals, including lean manufacturing objectives, minority business enterprise and diversity spending, environmental "green" initiatives, cost avoidance programs and low-cost country sourcing targets. Suppliers can implement KPIs to gain a competitive advantage. Suppliers have instant access to a user-friendly portal for submitting standardized cost savings templates. Suppliers and their customers exchange vital supply chain performance data while gaining visibility to the exact status of cost improvement projects and cost savings documentation.

Any business, regardless of size, can better manage supplier performance and overall supply chain performance, with the help of KPIs' robust capabilities, which include:
 Automated entry and approval functions
 On-demand, real-time scorecard measures
 Rework on procured inventory
 Single data repository to eliminate inefficiencies and maintain consistency
 Advanced workflow approval process to ensure consistent procedures
 Flexible data-input modes and real-time graphical performance displays
 Customized cost savings documentation
 Simplified setup procedures to eliminate dependence upon IT resources

Main KPIs for supply chain management will detail the following processes:
 Sales forecasts
 Inventory
 Procurement and suppliers
 Warehousing
 Transportation
 Reverse logistics

In a warehouse, the manager will use KPIs that target best use of the facility, like the receiving and put away KPIs to measure the receiving efficiency and the putaway cost per line. Storage KPIs can also be used to determine the efficiency of the storage space and the carrying cost of the inventory.

Government
The provincial government of Ontario, Canada has been using KPIs since 1998 to measure the performance of higher education institutions in the province. All post-secondary schools collect and report performance data in five areas – graduate satisfaction, student satisfaction, employer satisfaction, employment rate, and graduation rate. In England, Public Health England uses KPIs to provide a consistent measure of the performance of NHS population screening activities, and publication of up to four main KPIs for the most important contracts outsourced by each UK government department is seen as a measure helping to increase transparency in the delivery of public services.

Further performance indicators
 Duration of a stockout situation

 

 Customer order waiting time

Human Resource Management

 Employee turnover
 Ability to recruit to advertised roles
 Employee performance indicators
 Staff satisfaction/ results of staff surveys
 Proportion of staff unplanned absence (due to short or long term sickness)
 Cross-functional team analysis
 Organization contribution to Sector performance improvement Ex: Research Institutes contribution to Commercial Agriculture Improvement

Problems 
In practice, overseeing key performance indicators can prove expensive or difficult for organizations. Some indicators such as staff morale may be impossible to quantify. As such, dubious KPIs can be adopted that can be used as a rough guide rather than a precise benchmark.

Key performance indicators can also lead to perverse incentives and unintended consequences as a result of employees working to the specific measurements at the expense of the actual quality or value of their work.

Sometimes, collecting statistics can become a substitute for a better understanding of the problems, so the use of dubious KPIs can result in progress in aims and measured effectiveness becoming different. For example, during the Vietnam War, US soldiers were shown to be effective in kill ratios and high body counts, but this was misleading when used to measure aims as it did not show the lack of progress towards the US goal of increasing South Vietnamese government control of its territory. Another example would be to measure the productivity of a software development team in terms of lines of source code written. This approach can easily add large amounts of dubious code, thereby inflating the line count but adding little value in terms of systemic improvement. A similar problem arises when a footballer kicks a ball uselessly to build up their statistics.

See also
 Business intelligence
 Business performance management
 Community indicators
 Critical success factor
 Dashboarding
 Data presentation architecture
 Figure of merit
 Gap analysis
 Goodhart's law
 ITIL
 Key risk indicator
 Network performance
 Objectives and Key Results (OKRs)
 Overall equipment effectiveness
 Strategy Markup Language
 Supplier relationship management (SRM)

References

Further reading
 David Parmenter, Key Performance Indicators – Developing, Implementing, and Using Winning KPIs. (4th Edition). John Wiley & Sons 2020, .
 Bernard Marr, Key Performance Indicators: The 75+ Measures Every Manager Needs to Know. Financial Times/ Prentice Hall 2012, .
 Abeysiriwardana P.C., Jayasinghe-Mudalige U., Role of Peripheral Analysis Methods in Adoption of Successful KPIs for a Research Institute Working Towards Commercial Agriculture. https://doi.org/10.1007/s42943-021-00021-z in JGBC, 

Organizational performance management
Metrics
Business intelligence
Indicators